Arabela is an unincorporated community located in Lincoln County, New Mexico, United States.

A post office was established in 1901 and named Arabela by Andy Richardson, who became smitten with a local Apache woman, Arabela Barela. Barela, who with her sisters Damiana Barela and Carolina “Caro” Romero, owned and operated several cathouses in the area. The post office closed in 1928.

References

Unincorporated communities in Lincoln County, New Mexico
Unincorporated communities in New Mexico